The Dominican Summer League Mariners or DSL Mariners are a Minor league baseball team in the Dominican Summer League. They play in the Boca Chica South Division. They are a Seattle Mariners Rookie-Level affiliate.

Notable players
 Julio Rodríguez (born 2000), Dominican professional baseball outfielder

Roster

External links
DSL Mariners at Baseball America and Minor League Baseball

Seattle Mariners minor league affiliates
Dominican Summer League teams
Baseball teams in the Dominican Republic